Yves Frantz Loys Marie Le Pelley du Manoir, known as Yves du Manoir (August 11, 1904 - January 2, 1928) was a French rugby player.

Du Manoir was born at Vaucresson, into an aristocratic family; his father and mother were Viscount and Viscountess Le Pelley. He excelled at tennis, rowing, swimming, gymnastics and running. He also liked motorcycles. But it was as a rugby player that he stood out. He joined Racing Club de France, a Paris club, as he lived in the prestigious Rue de Rennes in the centre of the city. He was a versatile back, a good kicker and an excellent tackler, who played generally as fly-half.

He won his first cap for France at the age of 20 on January 1, 1925, at Colombes against Ireland. Despite a 3–9 defeat, his flamboyant style made him the darling of the crowd, who chanted his name during the game, and he was chosen as man of the match. He went on to get seven other caps, one as captain against Scotland in 1927.

The epitome of the perfect gentleman, Du Manoir was also a brain. He enrolled at the prestigious military school École polytechnique, where he graduated as an air force second lieutenant in 1925.

On January 2, 1928, France was hosting Scotland, but Du Manoir had to decline the invitation because that day he had to take an exam at the military camp where he was officially stationed (in Avord, near Bourges) to obtain his diploma that would allow him to qualify as a military pilot. The plane he got on, a Caudron 59, crashed a few minutes after take-off. Apparently, one wheel was caught in the branches of a poplar. The players learnt the news of the accident during the after-match functions. Georges Gerald, the France vice-captain and close friend of Du Manoir's with whom he played for Racing as centre, broke out in tears as he was making the traditional speech.

A monument was built where the accident happened. Barely four months after his death, Racing Club de France renamed its stadium after him. This was where France was going to play almost all its international home fixtures until 1973. There is a statue of Du Manoir at the entrance of the stadium, where Racing Club de France played until 2017.

In 1932, Racing Club de France created a famous club competition named after him, the Challenge Yves du Manoir, dedicated to the spirit of open play.

References

 Kurzbiografie
 
 

1904 births
1928 deaths
French rugby union players
Rugby union fly-halves
France international rugby union players
Burials at Père Lachaise Cemetery
Sportspeople from Hauts-de-Seine